Demolition is the first full-length demo recorded by the thrash metal band Vektor. Although a self-released demo, it is occasionally regarded as the band's first full-length album, due to its 48-minute length.

Track listing

Credits
David Disanto - guitar, vocals
Erik Nelson - guitars
Mike Tozzi - bass guitar
Adam Anderson - drums

References 

2006 albums
Vektor (band) albums